Neoniphon opercularis, the blackfin squirrelfish, also known as the mouth-fin squirrelfish or clearfin squirrelfish, is a species of squirrelfish found in the Indian Ocean and Pacific Ocean from East Africa as far east as New Caledonia. It eats crabs and shrimps. Its dorsal fin is raised to scare off or startle predators. It also has a large venomous spine at the corner of its preopercle. It is relatively unaffected by commercial fishing, but is sometimes used as bait for tuna fisheries.

References

External links
 Fishes of Australia : Neoniphon opercularis
 

blackfin squirrelfish
Marine fish of Northern Australia
blackfin squirrelfish
Taxa named by Achille Valenciennes